The following is a list of Michigan State Historic Sites in Kent County, Michigan. Sites marked with a dagger (†) are also listed on the National Register of Historic Places in Kent County, Michigan.


Current listings

See also
 National Register of Historic Places listings in Kent County, Michigan

Sources
 Historic Sites Online – Kent County. Michigan State Housing Developmental Authority. Accessed March 7, 2011.

References

Kent County
State Historic Sites
Tourist attractions in Kent County, Michigan